Invitation Songs is The Cave Singers' debut album. It was recorded in Vancouver and released on September 25, 2007, on Matador Records.

Track listing
All songs written by Derek Fudesco. 
"Seeds of Night" – 4:59
"Helen" – 3:48
"Dancing On Our Graves" – 3:24
"Cold Eye" – 3:26
"Royal Lawns" – 3:08
"Elephant Clouds" – 4:01
"New Monuments" – 3:52
"Oh Christine" – 3:53
"Bricks Of Our Home" – 3:36
"Called" – 3:37

Videos
"Dancing On Our Graves"

Personnel
 Pete Quirk – vocals, guitar, melodica, harmonica
 Derek Fudesco – guitar, bass pedals
 Marty Lund – drums, guitar

References

External links
Matador Records – The Cave Singers
The Cave Singers on Myspace

2007 debut albums
Matador Records albums
The Cave Singers albums